The  is a ski area on Mount Dainichi in Gifu Prefecture, Japan. The resort opened in 1999, developed by Tōwa Kankō. J Mountains Group acquired the resort in 2006, and is the current operator. The resort is known for its gondola and 3 half-pipes.

Aerial lifts

Gondola lift
The only gondola lift in the resort is called .
System: Gondola lift, 1 cable
Cable length: 
Vertical interval: 
Operational speed: 6.0 m/s
The fastest in Japan.
Passenger capacity per a cabin: 15
The largest in Japan.
Cabins: 57
Stations: 2
Duration of one-way trip: 4 minutes

Chairlifts
Champion Quad: 
Diamond Quad: 
Panorama Quad:

See also
List of ski areas and resorts in Asia
List of aerial lifts in Japan

External links

 Takasu Snow Park official website
 J Mountains Group official website

 Center house

Ski areas and resorts in Japan
Gondola lifts in Japan
Sports venues in Gifu Prefecture
1999 establishments in Japan
Gujō, Gifu